J.S.S. College (Janata Shikshana Samithi)  is a college campus in Vidyagiri, Dharwad, India, which offers number of courses for UG & PG students including Junior colleges. There campus is based in Vidhyagiri, Dharwad, Karanataka.

Campus
The college accommodates a school and its hostels, a post office and a bank.

Janata Shikshana Samiti has a network of education and nation-building institutions on the Vidyagiri Campus, like an Arts, Commerce and Science College, a Polytechnic Institute, an Economic Research Institute and the Law College at Hubli.

The Samiti campus has 40 quarters on the campus for its employees.  There are two boys' hostels, a girls' hostel, and a working women's hostel.  There is a library housed in a building constructed with UGC aid.

College
The J.S.S. Banashankari Arts, Commerce and Shantikumar Gubbi Science College, was started in 1944 by the Karnataka Education Board with 40 students.  It was taken over by the late Shri R.S. Hukkerikar, the veteran freedom fighter, constructive worker and educationist in 1952.  It was started as an intermediate college but the science wing was added in 1949.

With the increasing student strength, the college was bifurcated into the Banashankari Arts College and  S.K. Gubbi Science College in 1966.  The two colleges were once again amalgamated in June 1975.

After taking over the management of Janata Shikshana Samiti on 18 October 1973 by Pujya Shri Vishweshateertha Sripadangalavaru of Pejavarmath and Pujya Dr. D. Veerendra Heggade, dharmadhikari of Sri Kshetra Dharmasthala, the new management added a two-year P.U. job-oriented diploma course and Commerce section to the college in 1975 and 1977 respectively.

The college is affiliated to Karnataka University and teaches courses leading to a B.A. degree in Kannada, Sanskrit, Marathi English, Economics, Sociology, Political Science, History, Geography, Hindi, and Education as optional subjects.  It has a commerce wing and on the science side the college provides B.Sc. degree courses in Chemistry, Physics, Botany, Zoology, Statistics, Electronics, Mathematics as optional subjects.

Principals include such illustrious names as Prof. B.M. Shrikantaiah, the poet and freedom fighter, Prof. G.B. Jathar the economist, G. A. Kulkarni, a Marathi writer and Sahitya Academy Award recipient, Dr. Karamachand Wade, Dr. R. Y. Dharwadkar, the writer and educationist, Dr. V. G.Kulkarni an orator and educationist, Prof. N. Vajra Kumar the present Principal of the college represents the J.S.S. institutions on Governing Body as Secretary.

The institution carried out several experiments including an earn-while-you-learn programme.   Besides having a library, the college has two NCC companies, two units of NSS and a student welfare unit. The students are awarded scholarships including  studentships, government free ships, concessions under government schemes and other prizes instituted by the college and benevolent donors.  The Management of Janata Shikshana Samiti instituted 57 scholarships of the value of Rs. 100 /- each to encourage merited students and sportsmen.

History
Banashankari Arts and Commerce and Shantikumar Gubbi Science College is popularly known as J. S. S. or Janata Shikshana Samiti College after the name of the Trust that now runs it. It has been declared a Lead College by the Commissioner of  Collegiate Education, Karnataka.  Affiliated to Karnatak University, Dharwad, it saw its inception in 1944 under the Karnataka Education Board as an intermediate college, its science wing being added in 1949.  Increase in the student population compelled its management to split it into two colleges—Banashankari Arts and S. K. Gubbi Science in 1966.  They were merged again in 1975 to form a single entity. The college came under a new management, that of the J. S. S. in 1973.

Organisation and management
The Banashankari Arts and Commerce and S.K. Gubbi Science College, Dharwad, is managed by the Janata Shikshana Samiti that has another 20 institutions under its umbrella. This Samiti, in its turn, is a socially committed service providing front of the Shrikshetra Dharmasthala, said to be the Tirupati of Karnataka State. The top-level management which includes the President, the chairman and the Board of  Management is the main policy-making body controlling and monitoring the activities of the college.  This is followed by the Governing Council which takes care of the academic and infrastructure development, admission policy, students’ welfare schemes etc.

The Principal is the academic and administrative head of the college, who looks after the day-to-day administration.  She is assisted by the HoDs in academic matters and  the Internal Quality-Assurance Cell (IQAC) in  extra-curricular activities.  There are committees for different  activities. Appraisal of the financial transaction is done by the Internal Auditor, who is an employee of the institution and then by a qualified external auditor independently.

Size
The college in 2004-5 had 1,398 students, of which 785 were male and 613 female.  Unit cost of expenditure per student was Rs. 10, 821.00, as given by the college, which includes the students of the PUC, which, the PT feels, should have been left out of this account.

Sports and student life
College sports activities include athletics, basketball, table tennis, cricket, volleyball, and softball. There are playgrounds and  space for indoor games and recreational facilities.  It has five hostels, two for boys and three for girls, these having 582 (252+330) seats in all.

External links

Universities and colleges in Hubli-Dharwad